Jeff Fuller (born March 27, 1957) is an American former professional stock car racing driver. Before joining NASCAR's major leagues, Fuller won the 1992 Winston Modified Tour championship, driving for Sheba Racing. The Massachusetts native has 31 wins on the Modified Tour and was named the series' most popular drivers for three consecutive seasons (1992–1994).

Racing career

Busch Series 
Fuller made his Busch Series career in 1992, making one start. Driving the #20 First Ade Oldsmobile for Dick Moroso, Fuller started 27th and finished 26th, twenty-nine laps down.

Three years later, in 1995, after a run in the Whelen Modified Series, Fuller moved to the Busch Series to compete for Rookie of the Year. His team would be the #47 Sunoco Chevy owned by ST Motorsports. His sole top-5 was a fourth in the fall race at Charlotte. He also added on five other top-10s. His best start in the season was only a pair of tenths at New Hampshire and Rockingham. He also finished in the top-30 in all but one race and only recorded five DNFs. This enabled him to finish tenth in points in just his first season in Busch Series, earning him Rookie of the Year honors.

Missing two races relegated Fuller back to 17th in points in 1996. In the same weekend at Bristol, Fuller won his first career pole, won his first career race and his wife Liz gave birth to a child. Fuller only managed 3 other top-10s in 1996. He made one of his starts in a Michael Ritch-owned car, driving the #02 ECU Pirates at Rockingham to a 38th-place finish. To top off this great year, Fuller had a daughter named Tiffany Fuller. He had two more children, daughter Shannon and son Jeffrey Jr. That same year, Fuller won a race in a one-off start at Thompson Speedway in what was then the Busch North Series.

Fuller's team continued to struggle in early 1997. Fuller managed only two top-10s in his first fifteen races, (7th at Darlington and 3rd at New Hampshire) Fuller was released from the #47 after running eighteenth in points. Fuller missed the next two races, but then signed on to become the driver for the #45 Hunters Specialties Chevy for Mike Laughlin, earning finishes of 7th at Gateway and 9th at Bristol. However, Fuller was replaced for the last race by Greg Sacks, but drove the #5 Alka-Seltzer Chevy for Terry Labonte. After finishing 14th, he cemented a 21st-place finish in points.

In 1998, Fuller only made eleven starts, making races with five different teams. Most of the season was with the #89 Allerest Chevy owned by Meredith Ruark. His best finish with them was 25th at Charlotte. Overall, Fuller's best finish of 1998 was with Laughlin's racing team at Pikes Peak, where he finished eleventh. Fuller also  paired with  Joe Gibbs Racing in 1998. He drove their #42 Carolina Turkey Pontiac at Charlotte to a fifteenth-place finish. Fuller's other top-20 finish in 1998 was for Bill Elliott at Miami, where he finished fifteenth as well.

In 1999, Fuller made 27 of the season's 32 races, but did not record a single top-10. Fuller ran the first twenty-two races with Ruark's team, earning a best finish of 12th at Pikes Peak and IRP. While with the team, he also had a vicious accident a Dover when he spun and slammed into the pit road wall hard twice and breaking it after contact with Phil Parsons. Fuller made four starts for Joe Gibbs again, driving the #42 Circuit City Pontiac to a best of 12th at Darlington. Fuller also added on one more start with Lyndon Amick's team. He finished 33rd at Memphis Motorsports Park. Fuller's best start in 1999 was 5th at Pikes Peak, and he finished 22nd in points.

When Fuller went to Winston Cup racing, he only made one 2000 start. It was for Moy Racing, where he started 43rd on the field at Bristol, but came back to a 21st-place finish.

Fuller only made one start in 2001, as well. Driving for NEMCO Motorsports, he started 40th at California and finished 42nd after only completing five laps.

Fuller made two more starts for NEMCO in 2002, running at Daytona and Talladega. However, despite a 5th-place start at Daytona, he finished 42nd there and 40th at Talladega due to large multi car crashes.

Fuller made thirteen starts overall in 2003, driving for assorted teams. Mainly, he split his time between NEMCO and Stanton Barrett's team. His best finishes on the year were a 15th at Bristol for NEMCO and 18th at Nashville for Barrett. He also had a 24th-place run at Daytona for Bost Motorsports. He only finished 3 races that year.

In 2004, he ran the most races in a season of his career since 1999 for NEMCO Motorsports. Unfortunately, his best finish was 35th at Nazareth, as he did not finish a race that year. He also caused controversy during the season as he rarely completed more than a handful of laps before pulling out of the race.

In 2005, Fuller started off the year driving two races for NEMCO, but he was quickly replaced by Kim Crosby, whose team bought the #7 NEMCO ride. Ironically, Fuller replaced Crosby later in the year, driving the #7 Big Boar Customs Chevy for GIC-Mixon Motorsports for the remainder of the year. Fuller qualified for fifteen races with the team, and his best finishes were at Dover, where he finished 24th in the fall and 25th in the spring. After Memphis, where Fuller finished 42nd, the team folded due to lack of funding, leaving Fuller without a ride.

Fuller returned to the Busch Series in 2006 at the June Nashville race. He was signed to drive the #34 GlowBuoy Chevrolet for Frank Cicci Racing where he started 38th and finishing 27th.

For 2007, Fuller drove for Stanton Barrett Motorsports on a limited basis.

Fuller began the 2008 season looking for a ride. Meanwhile, Fuller remained in the garage area during most Nationwide Series races helping young drivers learn to handle their car and master new tracks. In February 2008, Fuller traveled to Afghanistan for a 10-day visit to 6 camps meeting soldiers, signing autographs and seeing first hand what the troops go through while deployed.

R3 Motorsports placed Fuller behind the wheel of their No. 23 Chevrolet for the 2009 NASCAR Nationwide Series race at Darlington Raceway. Fuller replaced Robert Richardson, Jr. for the 200-lap event. This was his first series start since the Montreal road course race in 2008, and he finished in 30th place.

Fuller planned to drive the #97 Chevrolet in the 2010 Nationwide Season opener at Daytona for NEMCO Motorsports, but he withdrew even though he would have made the race, after qualifying was cancelled due to rain. Fuller was one of five drivers to be paid by John Menard and team owner Jack Roush (the approximate amount for each driver was around $45,000, equivalent to a last-place finish)  to drop out so John's son Paul could compete.

Sprint Cup Series 
Fuller made his Cup Series debut in 1992, running the #88 Pontiac for John and Scott Bandzul at Richmond. He started 30th and finished 29th in the 35-car field after he broke a water pump.

Fuller then made seven starts in 2000 after a number of years on the Busch Series. He was tapped to drive the #27 Viagra Pontiac for Eel River Racing. Fuller made six of the first seven races, having a best finish of 22nd at Atlanta and a best start of 7th at Texas, but was released in favor of Mike Bliss. The Eel River team would eventually go through several drivers to include Kenny Wallace and eventually folded due to lack of funding. Later in 2000, Fuller drove the #98 MacPherson Motorsports Ford at Charlotte. He made the race with them with a 27th-place start and 41st-place finish. The team closed its doors before the 2001 Daytona 500.

Fuller tacked on three starts in 2004, running the #50 Arnold Motorsports Dodge in the later stages of the year.  He was 43rd at California and Dover and then 42nd at Charlotte. Charlotte was his best start on the year with a 26th-place start.

Fuller made two starts in 2005, when he drove for Mach 1 Racing. However, Fuller finished 43rd in both the races. (Darlington and Dover) His best start was 40th at Darlington.

In 2007, Fuller tested the #80 Joe Gibbs Racing Chevy at Daytona.

For 2008,  Fuller tested the #87 of Front Row Motorsports for the 2008 Daytona 500. In February 2008, Fuller traveled to Afghanistan for a 10-day visit to 6 camps supporting the US and Coalition Forces.

Fuller was going to drive the #97 FrontRowJoe.com Toyota as a second car for NEMCO Motorsports in the 2010 Daytona 500 as a safety-net car for team owner Joe Nemechek should his #87 not make the race. When Nemechek's car made the race, Fuller started the duel and quickly pulled it behind the wall. Fuller was also entered in the No. 97 for the 2010 Drive 4 COPD 300, and was in the field after qualifying was washed out, but was paid to withdraw when several cars running the full schedule were locked out of the race.

Fuller was entered for the Aarons 499, but withdrew before qualifying with rain threatening qualifying. Fuller and the 97 were not entered for the Coke Zero 400.

Fuller qualified the #97 HeatRedefined.com NEMCO Motorsports Toyota in 13th for the 2010 AMP Energy Juice 500 at Talladega. He finished 43rd after only completing 2 laps. Again, this car was entered as both a safety net car, as well as a financial gain for the 87 as with both cars making the race, and a fully sponsored 87, allowed Nemechek to run the race to completion.

Kentucky Crash

Jeff was involved in an incredible accident at the Kentucky Speedway on June 17, 2006, when he swerved to avoid Jason Leffler's spinning car and ended up hitting the inside wall at almost full speed. The car practically imploded upon impact and then burst into flames briefly. Despite the car hitting the wall on the right side, the left side came apart. Amazingly, he never lost consciousness but the car's roof had to be cut off to extract him. He was taken to the hospital to be treated for smoke inhalation and amazingly only a broken wrist and finger. He was released the next day. They determined that the implosion of the car was due to a faulty roll cage which failed during the crash.

Fuller made a full recovery from the accident, but when Frank Cicci closed up the #34 team for the rest of the year, Fuller was again left without a ride and his status.

Motorsports career results

NASCAR
(key) (Bold – Pole position awarded by qualifying time. Italics – Pole position earned by points standings or practice time. * – Most laps led.)

Sprint Cup Series

Daytona 500

Nationwide Series

Busch North Series

Whelen Southern Modified Tour

References

External links

1957 births
Living people
NASCAR drivers
People from Boylston, Massachusetts
Racing drivers from Massachusetts
Sportspeople from Worcester County, Massachusetts
Joe Gibbs Racing drivers